Palmer may refer to:

People and fictional characters
 Palmer (pilgrim), a medieval European pilgrim to the Holy Land
 Palmer (given name), including a list of people and fictional characters
 Palmer (surname), including a list of people and fictional characters

Arts and entertainment
 Palmer (film), a 2021 American drama film
 Palmer Museum of Art, the art museum of Pennsylvania State University

Places
 Palmer River (disambiguation)
 Mount Palmer (disambiguation)

Antarctica
 Palmer Inlet, Palmer Land
 Palmer Land, a portion of the Antarctic Peninsula
 Palmer Peninsula, former American name of the Antarctic Peninsula

Australia
 Palmer, Queensland, a locality
 Palmer, South Australia, a town
 Palmer River (Northern Territory), a tributary of the Finke River
 Palmer River, Queensland

Canada
 Palmer, Ontario, Canada, a community in Burlington
 Palmer, Saskatchewan, an unorganized hamlet
 Palmer Township, Algoma District, Ontario
 Palmer, British Columbia, site of former Fort Victoria (British Columbia)

United Kingdom
 Palmer Park, Reading, England, a public park

United States
 Palmer, Alaska, a city
 Palmer, Illinois, a village
 Palmer, Indiana, an unincorporated community
 Palmer, Iowa, a city
 Palmer, Kansas, a city
 Palmer, Massachusetts, a city
 Palmer (CDP), Massachusetts, a former census-designated place in the town
 Palmer, Michigan, an unincorporated community
 Palmer, Missouri, a ghost town
 Palmer, Nebraska, a village
 Palmer, Tennessee, a town
 Palmer, Texas, a town in Ellis County
 Palmer, Cameron County, Texas, a census-designated place
 Palmer, Washington, an unincorporated community
 Palmer, West Virginia, a ghost town
 Palmer, Wisconsin, an unincorporated community
 Palmer Creek (Turnagain Arm), Alaska
 Palmer Creek (Yamhill River), Oregon
 Palmer Divide, Colorado, a ridge
 Palmer Glacier, Oregon
 Palmer Park (Chicago), Illinois, a public park
 Palmer Park (Detroit), Michigan, a public park
 Palmer Park, Colorado Springs, Colorado, a public park
 Palmer River (Massachusetts – Rhode Island)
 Palmer Township (disambiguation)

Businesses
 C. F. Palmer, Ltd, a British scientific instrument maker
 Château Palmer, a Bordeaux wine producer
 Palmer Bus Service, a bus company in Minnesota and Wisconsin
 Palmer Candy Company, a candy manufacturer in Sioux City, Iowa
 Palmer National Bank of Washington, D.C., from 1983 to 1995
 William Eastman Palmer & Sons, a British partnership of photographers based in Devon

Schools
 Palmer High School (disambiguation)
 Palmer Memorial Institute, Sedalia, North Carolina, a former school for upper class African-Americans
 Palmer College of Chiropractic, Davenport, Iowa
 Palmer's College, Thurrock, Essex, England
 Palmer School, founded 1972, merged with Trinity Episcopal School to form Palmer Trinity School, Palmetto Bay, Florida
 Palmer Theological Seminary, Wynnewood, Pennsylvania
 Palmer Catholic Academy, a Roman Catholic secondary school in Ilford in London, England

Sports
 Palmer Field, a sports stadium in Middletown, Connecticut
 Palmer Stadium, a former sports stadium of Princeton University, Princeton, New Jersey

Other uses
 , two US Navy vessels
 Palmer (mango), a commercial mango variety originating in south Florida
 Palmer railway station, Victoria, British Columbia, Canada
 Palmer Road (disambiguation)
 Palmer Station, an American research station in Antarctica

See also
 Palmar (disambiguation)
 Palmer Method, a handwriting system
 Palmer notation, used by dentists
 Palmers (disambiguation)
 Palmier, a type of puff pastry-based cookie